The Akron Black Tyrites were a Negro league baseball team that played out another team's schedule for a portion of a single season. They were based in Akron, Ohio, and were a member team of the Negro National League (II). They are also known as the Akron Grays.

The Columbus Blue Birds finished last in the first half of the 1933 season, were disbanded and ended up merging with the Tyrites, one of the top independent Negro league teams of their day. The Tyrites then more or less became the Cleveland Giants, which finished out Columbus's schedule for the season. The team did not continue after 1933.

References

Loverro, Thom. The Encyclopedia of Negro League Baseball. New York:Facts on File, Inc., 2003. .

Sports in Akron, Ohio
Negro league baseball teams
Defunct baseball teams in Ohio
Baseball teams disestablished in 1933
Baseball teams established in 1933